Donnchadh of Angus, ruled from 1206 until 1214 as Mormaer of Angus. Little is known about his life, but he seems to have been dead by 1214.

Bibliography
 Roberts, John L., Lost Kingdoms: Celtic Scotland in the Middle Ages, (Edinburgh, 1997), pp. 53–4

1214 deaths
People from Angus, Scotland
Year of birth unknown
13th-century mormaers
Mormaers of Angus